The Victorian Athletic League organises professional footrunning events ranging from 70 to 3200 metres. The most famous of these events is the Stawell Gift which has been run since 1878 and hosts the richest footrace in Australia. Many other gifts are held around Victoria in country and metro locations including Ballarat, Bendigo, Wangaratta, Maryborough, Keilor, Yarrawonga, Ringwood, Rye and Olympic Park. Races are run under a handicap system which makes races competitive. Each race has a different handicap limit. Generally, the greater the sum of the prize money for a race, the less handicap is available, limiting the class of runners that can win. Runners are awarded prize money when making finals and bookmaking occurs at major meets.

History of Professional Running 
The oldest professional carnival in Victoria is the Maryborough Gift which celebrated its 155th anniversary on New years Day 2016.

Present Day Professional Footrunning 

Australia's best known footrace is the Stawell Gift, held at Easter since 1878. The other major carnival that has been run continuously for more than 100 years is the Burnie Gift in Tasmania. It was first run in 1885.

The status as the richest carnival was challenged for a time in NSW with the running of the Botany Bay Gift Carnival which, in the 1990s. boasts total prize money of $120,000 and $70,000 for its main race with a $50,000 first prize. The excellent event, however, faded from the scene when sponsorship became difficult to maintain.
 
The Stawell Carnival has a total prize money pool of $90,000. The main race, the Stawell Gift, is over 120m and the winner receives $40, 000.

There are many other carnivals and events conducted under handicap foot-running conditions throughout the nation each year.

Apart from Stawell and Burnie, some of the more famous long-running carnivals are the Bay Sheffield Carnival in South Australia, Bendigo and Ballarat in Victoria, the Christmas Carnivals in North Western Tasmania,  and an annual Gift on the Gold Coast in Queensland, Temora and Macksville Carnivals in New South Wales. Since the late 1980s athletics and the Olympic Games have been 'open', meaning that the so-called amateurs and professionals can all compete together for prize money without being penalised or discriminated against.

History of the Victorian Athletic League 

The Victorian Athletic League was established in 1895. Professional running in Australia began in the gold-mining days and boomed in areas where miners were prospecting and digging for gold. The miners raced against each other for the gift of a gold nugget offered by the local publican or mine owner. The miners raced over various distances but the main race was run over the Sheffield distance of 130 yards.

In the 1860s big money began to creep into the sport which attracted a wealth of athletic talent. Competitions took on a carnival atmosphere and crowds flocked to see local champions. In April 1878, nearly two thousand people witnessed the running of the first Stawell Easter Gift which was won by 24-year-old farmer W.J.Millard. The sport of professional running continued to grow. Big prize money and heavy betting attracted talented athletes as well as a range of shady characters.

By the early 1890s, the sport of professional running was in crisis. Athletes running under false names, hiding past performance, corrupt officials and other controversies led the need to establish a controlling body for professional running in Victoria. The Victorian Athletic League was formed on 15 April 1895 when RV Lewis of Benalla was elected president and Hastings Bell of Stawell was appointed secretary. Originally the League was administered from Stawell and formulated rules and regulations for country towns that conducted sports carnivals. It also acted as arbitrator in any disputes arising at those carnivals.

In 1902 a regular office was established in Melbourne and the Victorian Athletic League began to promote the sport of professional running. Carnivals were held in Melbourne and major Victorian towns and became extremely popular with the sporting public. 1917, a dispute over prize money led to a breakaway group, the Victorian Athletic Association, being formed and conducting event in opposition to the Victorian Athletic League. In 1921, through the mediation of the Stawell Athletic Club, the Victorian Athletic League and the Victorian Athletic Association were merged. ES Herring of Maryborough was elected president and Joe Bull appointed as secretary. The Victorian Athletic League established an office in Brunswick and held mid week sports meetings were held at White City in Tottenham, at the Exhibition Grounds and at the Monodrome. During the 1920s and 1930s, popularity of professional running grew tremendously and the VAL staged World Sprint Championships.

At the outbreak of World War II, many Victorian Athletic League clubs abandoned their meetings. However, the federal cabinet granted permission for the Victorian Athletic League to conduct footrunning at Maribyrnong for the benefit of athletes on leave from the armed forces and men employed in essential services. After World War II the Victorian Athletic League gained strength and had nearly fifteen hundred registered runners, three hundred trainers and was conducted sports carnivals at seventy centres across Victoria from mid November to early June.

By the early 1960s, interest in professional running had waned. The number of registered runners had declined and only twenty-eight carnivals were held across Victoria. In an effort to revive the sport, the Victorian Athletic League invited champion international athletes such as Bob Hayes, Alan Simpson and Robbie Hutchison to compete in Australia. In 1969, the St Kilda club staged the richest footrace in the world with a first prize of $2,000. In 1977, the Victorian Athletic League undertook substantial administrative changes becoming an incorporated company, establishing a computerised record of handicaps and results, and commissioning the use of an electronic race finish recording machine. After years of segregation between amateur and professional athletics, in 1986 saw the dawning of open athletics when Stawell Gift winners Chris Perry and John Dinan competed for Australia at the Commonwealth Games in Edinburgh.

In recent years, the Victorian Athletic League has extended its athletic format beyond club carnivals. The League moved into conducting special events such as the famous Dandy Dollar Dash at VFL/AFL football matches, the Moomba Mile run down Bourke Street in the Melbourne CBD, 400 metres series' during international cricket matches at the MCG and sprint events during horse races at Moonee Valley. In 2001, the Victorian Athletic League moved offices to be co-located with Athletics Victoria at Olympic Park in Melbourne. The League began to form a strong alliance with Athletics Victoria through formal affiliation, sharing resources and establishing a dual-registration process.

Athletes that have run in Professional Footrunning Events 

(Include VAL, SAAL, QAL, NSWAL, TAL)

- Cathy Freeman

- Linford Christie

- Robert De Castella

- Josh Ross

- Jana Rawlinson

- Tamsyn Lewis

- Nova Peris-Kneebone

- Melinda Gainsford-Taylor

- Madeleine Pape (Australian Olympian)

- Bola Lawal (Nigerian Olympian)

- George McNeill (Scotland)

- J.L. Ravelomanantsoa (Madagascar)

- Rick Dunbar

Rye Gift 

Held on the second Saturday of January every year, the Rye Gift attracts tourists celebrating the Christmas period and New Year. It has bookies and the track for the 120m is on a slight decline.

Past Winners  2000-2020 (Men's)

2000 R Devalle

2001 M Moresi

2002 C Touhy

2003 C Foley

2004 C Dunbar

2005 G Brown

2006 D Burgess

2007 M Callard

2008 P O'Dwyer

2009 R Medford

2010 Douglas Greenough

2011 Craig Rollinson

2012 Cam Dunbar

2013 Bros Kelly

2014 Matt Carter

2015 Paul Tancredi

2016 Noddy Angelakos

2017 Nathan Riali

2018 Maddie Coates

2019 Aaron Leferink

2020 Matt Burleigh

Past Winners 2000-2020 (Women's)

2000 A Fearnley

2001 J Chehadei

2002 K Moore

2003 A Deery

2004 A Deary

2004 A Deery

2006 C White

2007 K Steward

2008 M Dean

2009 A Crook

2010 Katie Moore

2011 Alice Platten

2012 Eleni Gilden

2013 Stephanie Mollica

2014 Jessica Payne

2015 Taylah Perry

2016 Celia Cosgriff

2017 Ebony Lane

2018 Holly Dobbyn

2019 Kysha Praciak

2020 Bree Masters

Ringwood 

Hosted by the Ringwood Professional Athletic club this event is held usually in January. Its gift has ranged from 120m, 200m and 400m over the years. Currently the Gift race is held over 400m.

Past Winners

2003 E King

2004 G Mawer

2005 J Hooper

2006 J Boulton

2007 C White

2008 D Collinge

2009 D Steinhauser

2010 S Woodrow

2011 T West

2012 D Girolamo

2013 J Blake

2014 L Stevens

2015 L Coop

2016 G Mitchell

2017 D Haigh

Wangaratta 

This event attracts both VAL and NSWAL competitors because of the close proximity of the event. Professional cycling events are also held at the same time as the footrunning.

Past Winners

2000 P Walsh

2001 M Callard

2002 E Everton

2003 J Hilditch (Scotland)

2004 J Lewis

2005 D Arthur

2006 J Boulton

2007 A Flanagan

2008 C Foley

2009 R Ballard

2010 G Stephens

2011 T Ireland

2012 C Dunbar

2013 R Parkinson

2014 M Hargreaves

2015 P Tancredi

2016 P Tancredi

2017 H Kerr

2018 H Wyllie

2019 J Bailey

2020 J Bailey

Ballarat 

The Ballarat Gift as a strong history dating back to 1949. It has been held at City Oval, Sebastopol Oval and Northern Oval where VFL team the North Ballarat Roosters play. It was first conducted in 1949 and won by Ted Marantelli. During much of the 1970s and 1980s the only Gift conducted in Ballarat was the Sebastopol Gift. After the demise of the Sebatopol Gift in 1988, the Ballarat Gift returned to the VAL calendar in 1989 at the City Oval.

After traditionally being held in February since inception, in 2010 the Ballarat Gift was moved to the weekend after the Stawell Easter Gift (April). With the assistance of the Goldfields Council, the Gift was worth a record $40,000. With all six Stawell Gift finalists entered, the 2010 Ballarat Gift final featured four of them including Stawell Gift winner Tom Burbidge. The Gift was won by 44-year-old Ballarat based, self trained athlete, Peter O'Dwyer. It was O'Dwyer's second Ballarat Gift after winning the race in 1996.

Past Winners (since it was resurrected in 1989)
 2020 Michael Hanna
 2019 Bikramjeet Singh
 2018 Luke Mitchell
 2017 Jasper Nettlefold
 2016 Noddy Angelakos
 2015 Craig Mair
 2014 Nathan Riali
 2013 Glenn Ross
 2012 David Tinney
 2011 Andrew McCabe
 2010 Peter O'Dwyer
 2009 Rod Matthews
 2008 Bola Lawal (Nigeria)
 2007 Nick Sampieri
 2006 Nathan Dixon
 2005 Warwick Vale
 2004 Victor Oyanedal
 2003 Scott Beaven
 2002 Bett Blanco
 2001 John Cara
 2000 Darren Paull
 1999	Chris Pattison
 1998	Robert Ballard (NSW)
 1997	Shaun White
 1996	Peter O'Dwyer
 1995	Vince Cavallo
 1994	Andrew Paull
 1993	Tony Birrell
 1992	Mark Ladbrook
 1991	Chris Russell
 1990	Peter Bennetto
 1989	Peter Bennetto

Bendigo 

The Bendigo Opal is held around March every year and coincides with the International Cycling Madison. It holds the richest 400m footrace in the world.

Past Winners

2003 Duncan Tippins

2004 Mark Howard

2005 Nathan Dixon
 
2006 Tommy Neim

2007 Nick Magree
 
2008 Glenn Stephens

Stawell Gift 

The Stawell Gift is considered the country's and quite possibly world's most prestigious professional footrace. Over 120m it is televised across the country and thousands are at Stawell every year at Easter.

Stawell Gift Winners 1990-2018 
 2018  Jacob Despard,         Tasmania
 2017  Matthew Rizzo,         Langwarrin    (VIC)
 2016  Isaac Dunmall,        East Brisbane  (QLD)
 2015  Murray Goodwin,       Burleigh Heads (QLD)
 2014  Luke Versace,             Melbourne (VIC)
 2013  Andrew Robinson,             Launceston (TAS)
 2012  Matthew Wiltshire,             Ballarat (VIC)
 2011  Mitchell Williams-Swain,             Gold Coast (QLD)
 2010  Tom Burbidge,             Canberra (ACT)
 2009  Aaron Stubbs,            Kurrawa (QLD)
 2008  Sam Jamieson,            Williamstown (VIC)
 2007  Nathan Allen,	        Toowoomba (QLD)
 2006  Adrian Mott,	        Essendon (VIC)
 2005  Joshua Ross,	        Gillieston(NSW)
 2004  Jason Hunte,	        Barbados
 2003  Joshua Ross,	        North Lambton (NSW)
 2002  Stuart Uhlmann,	        Cedar Grove (QLD)
 2001  Andrew Pym,	        South Riverview (NSW)
 2000  Jarram Pearce,	        Wodonga (VIC)
 1999  Rod Matthews,	        Buninyong (VIC)
 1998  Dale Seers,	        Edithvale (VIC)
 1997  Daniel Millard,           Mt Gambier (SA)
 1996  Steve Hutton,             Alberton (SA)
 1995  Glenn Crawford,           Katamatite (VIC)
 1994  Rod Lewis,                  Ringwood (VIC)
 1993  Jason Richardson,       Caulfield South (VIC)
 1992  Andrew McManus,             Essendon (VIC)
 1991  Steve Brimacombe,       Eltham (VIC)
 1990  Dean Capobianco,          Kalamunda (WA)

History of finalists:

References

External links
 http://www.val.org.au/
 http://www.stawellgift.com/
 https://web.archive.org/web/20020208042218/http://www.geocities.com/~ewen/r2002_01.html
 http://www.myspace.com/victorianathleticleague

Athletics in Australia
At
Sports organizations established in 1895
Athletics organizations
1895 establishments in Australia